Ascopolyporus is a genus of fungi within the family Cordycipitaceae. Species are pathogens of scale insects.

References

Sordariomycetes genera
Clavicipitaceae